Walkin' the Razor's Edge is the fourth studio album by the Canadian heavy metal band Helix. It was released on the Capitol Records label in 1984, reaching No. 27 on the Canadian RPM Album Chart, and selling 100,000 copies in Canada and 400,000 internationally. 

The video for its lead single, "Rock You", which was filmed in a quarry in Kitchener, Ontario, is perhaps best known for the image of guitar player Brent Doerner emerging from the water to play his guitar solo. "Rock You" reached number 27 on the Canadian RMP Pop Singles Chart, although it was more popular on Canadian rock radio stations. The second single was the Crazy Elephant cover "Gimme Gimme Good Lovin'". Two versions of its music video were filmed: One for music video channels, and the other being an "adult" version featuring topless models including a then 16-year-old porn star Traci Lords. This version was aired on the Playboy Channel in the United States. The band also made a promotional video for their A Foot in Coldwater cover, "(Make Me Do) Anything You Want", with the song reaching number 44 on the Canadian RPM Pop Chart.

Track listing

Personnel

Band members
 Brian Vollmer – lead vocals
 Brent "The Doctor" Doerner – guitars, backing vocals
 Paul Hackman – guitars, backing vocals
 Daryl Gray – bass, backing vocals
 Greg "Fritz" Hinz – drums

Additional musicians
Spider Sinnaeve – additional bass

Production
Produced by Tom Treumuth for Hypnotic Productions, except "Rock You" and "Young & Wreckless", co-produced by Helix and Rodney Mills
Bonus tracks produced by Simon Hanhart
Recorded & Engineered by Dave Wittman
Recorded at Phase One Studios (Toronto), Electric Lady (New York City), Studio One (Atlanta)
Rodney Mills – mixing
Gregory M. Quesnel – mixing assistant
Originally Mastered by Bob Ludwig
Remastered by Jon Astley (2009 Rock Candy version)
Heather Brown, Robert Meecham – art direction

Charts

Album

Singles

References 

Helix (band) albums
1984 albums
Capitol Records albums
Albums recorded at Electric Lady Studios